Arthur Fletcher (birth unknown) is an English former professional rugby league footballer who played in the 1940s and 1950s.

Playing career

County Honours
Arthur Fletcher was selected for Yorkshire County XIII whilst at Wakefield Trinity during the 1947/48, 1948/49, 1953/54 and 1954/55 seasons.

County Cup Final appearances
Arthur Fletcher played  in Wakefield Trinity’s 10–0 victory over Hull F.C. in the 1946–47 Yorkshire County Cup during the 1946–47 season at Headingley Rugby Stadium, Leeds on Saturday 31 November 1946, played  in the 7–7 draw with Leeds in the 1947–48 Yorkshire County Cup Final during the 1947–48 season at Fartown Ground, Huddersfield on Saturday 1 November 1947, played  in the 8–7 victory over Leeds in the 1947–48 Yorkshire County Cup Final replay during the 1947–48 season at Odsal Stadium, Bradford on Wednesday 5 November 1947, and played  in the 17–3 victory over Keighley in the 1951–52 Yorkshire County Cup Final during the 1951–52  season at Fartown Ground, Huddersfield on Saturday 27 October 1951.

Club career
Arthur Fletcher made his début for Wakefield Trinity during April 1946, he appears to have scored no drop-goals (or field-goals as they are currently known in Australasia), but prior to the 1974–75 season all goals, whether; conversions, penalties, or drop-goals, scored 2-points, consequently prior to this date drop-goals were often not explicitly documented, therefore '0' drop-goals may indicate drop-goals not recorded, rather than no drop-goals scored. In addition, prior to the 1949–50 season, the archaic field-goal was also still a valid means of scoring points.

References

External links
Search for "Fletcher" at rugbyleagueproject.org

English rugby league players
Living people
Place of birth missing (living people)
Rugby league five-eighths
Rugby league halfbacks
Wakefield Trinity captains
Wakefield Trinity players
Year of birth missing (living people)
Yorkshire rugby league team players